The core of the English language descends from the Old English language, brought from the 500s with the Anglo, Saxon, and Jutish settlers to what would be called England. The bulk of the language in spoken and written texts is from this source. As a statistical rule, around 70 percent of words in any text are Old English. Moreover, the grammar is largely Old English.

A significant portion of the English vocabulary comes from Romance and Latinate sources. Estimates of native words (derived from Old English) range from 20%–33%, with the rest made up of outside borrowings. A portion of these borrowings come directly from Latin, or through one of the Romance languages, particularly Anglo-Norman and French, but some also from Italian, Portuguese, and Spanish; or from other languages (such as Gothic, Frankish or Greek) into Latin and then into English. The influence of Latin in English, therefore, is primarily lexical in nature, being confined mainly to words derived from Latin roots.

While some new words enter English as slang, most do not. Some words are adopted from other languages; some are mixtures of existing words (portmanteau words), and some are new creations made of roots from dead languages.

Word origins 
A computerized survey of about 80,000 words in the old Shorter Oxford Dictionary (3rd ed.) was published in Ordered Profusion by Thomas Finkenstaedt and Dieter Wolff (1973) that estimated the origin of English words as follows:

 French: 28.30%
 Latin, including modern scientific and technical Latin: 28.24%
 Germanic languages – inherited from Old English, from Proto-Germanic, or a more recent borrowing from a Germanic language such as Old Norse; does not include Germanic words borrowed from a Romance language, i.e., coming from the Germanic element in French, Latin or other Romance languages: 25%
 Greek: 5.32%
 No etymology given: 4.04%
 Derived from proper names: 3.28%
 All other languages: less than 1%

A survey by Joseph M. Williams in Origins of the English Language of 10,000 words taken from several thousand business letters gave this set of statistics:
 French (langue d'oïl): 41%
 "Native" English: 33%
 Latin: 15%
 Old Norse: 5%
 Dutch: 1%
 Other: 5%

Languages influencing the English language

Here is a list of the most common foreign language influences in English, where other languages have influenced or contributed words to English.

Celtic

Celtic words are almost absent, except for dialectal words, such as the Yan Tan Tethera system of counting sheep. However, hypotheses have been made that English syntax was influenced by Celtic languages, such as the system of continuous tenses was a cliché of similar Celtic phrasal structures. This is controversial, as the system has clear native English and other Germanic developments.

French

The French contributed legal, military, technological, and political terminology. Their language also contributed common words, such as the names of meats: veal, mutton, beef, pork, and how food was prepared: boil, broil, fry, roast, and stew; as well as words related to the nobility: prince, duke, marquess, viscount, baron, and their feminine equivalents. Nearly 30 percent of English words (in an 80,000 word dictionary) are of French origin.

Latin

Most words in English that are derived from Latin are scientific and technical words, medical terminology, academic terminology, and legal terminology.

Greek

English words derived from Greek include scientific and medical terminology (for instance -phobias and -ologies), Christian theological terminology.

Norman
Castle, cauldron, kennel, catch, cater are among Norman words introduced into English. The Norman language also introduced (or reinforced) words of Norse origin such as mug.

Dutch

There are many ways through which Dutch words have entered the English language: via trade and navigation, such as skipper (from schipper), freebooter (from vrijbuiter), keelhauling (from kielhalen); via painting, such as landscape (from landschap), easel (from ezel), still life (from stilleven); warfare, such as forlorn hope (from verloren hoop), beleaguer (from beleger), to bicker (from bicken); via civil engineering, such as dam, polder, dune (from duin); via the New Netherland settlements in North America, such as  cookie (from koekie), boss from baas, Santa Claus (from Sinterklaas); via Dutch/Afrikaans speakers with English speakers in South Africa, such as wildebeest, apartheid, boer; via French words of Dutch/Flemish origin that have subsequently been adopted into English, such as boulevard (from bolwerk), mannequin (from manneken), buoy (from boei).

Spanish

Words from Iberian Romance languages (aficionado, albino, alligator, cargo, cigar, embargo, guitar, jade, mesa, paella, platinum, plaza, renegade, rodeo, salsa, savvy, sierra, siesta, tilde, tornado, vanilla etc.). Words relating to warfare and tactics, for instance flotilla, and guerrilla; or related to science and culture. Words originated in Amerindian civilizations (Cariban: cannibal, hurricane; Mescalero: apache; Nahuatl: tomato, coyote, chocolate; Quechua: Jerky, potato; Taíno: tobacco),

Italian

Words relating to some music, piano, fortissimo. Or Italian culture, such as piazza, pizza, gondola, balcony, fascism. The English word umbrella comes from Italian ombrello.

Indian languages

Words relating to culture, originating from the colonial era. e.g., atoll, avatar, bandana, bangles, buddy, bungalow, calico, candy, cashmere, chit, cot, curry, cushy, dinghy, guru, juggernaut, jungle, karma, khaki, lacquer, lilac, loot, mandarin, mantra, polo, pyjamas, shampoo, thug, tiffin, verandah.

German

English is a Germanic language. As a result, many words are distantly related to German. Most German words relating to World War I and World War II found their way into the English language, words such as Blitzkrieg, Anschluss, Führer, and Lebensraum; food terms, such as bratwurst, hamburger and frankfurter; words related to psychology and philosophy, such a gestalt, Übermensch, zeitgeist, and realpolitik. From German origin are also: wanderlust, schadenfreude, kaputt, kindergarten, autobahn, rucksack.

Old Norse

Words of Old Norse origin have entered English primarily from the contact between Old Norse and Old English during colonisation of eastern and northern England between the mid 9th to the 11th centuries (see also Danelaw). Many of these words are part of English core vocabulary, such as they, egg, sky or knife.

Hebrew and Yiddish
Words used in religious contexts, like Sabbath, kosher, hallelujah, amen, and jubilee or words that have become slang like schmuck, shmooze, nosh, oy vey, and schmutz.

Arabic

Trade items such as borax, coffee, cotton, hashish, henna, mohair, muslin, saffron; Islamic religious terms such as jihad, Assassin, hadith, and sharia; scientific vocabulary borrowed into Latin in the 12th and 13th centuries (alcohol, alkali, algebra, azimuth, zenith, cipher, nadir); plants or plant products originating in tropical Asia and introduced to medieval Europe through Arabic intermediation (camphor, jasmine, lacquer, lemon, orange, sugar); Middle Eastern and Maghrebi cuisine words (couscous, falafel, hummus, kebab, tahini).

Counting
Cardinal numbering in English follows two models, Germanic and Italic. The basic numbers are zero through ten. The numbers eleven through nineteen follow native Germanic style, as do twenty, thirty, forty, fifty, sixty, seventy, eighty, and ninety.

Standard English, especially in very conservative formal contexts, continued to use native Germanic style as late as World War I for intermediate numbers greater than 20, viz., "one-and-twenty," "five-and-thirty," "seven-and-ninety," and so on. But with the advent of the Industrial Revolution, the Latin tradition of counting as "twenty-one," "thirty-five," "ninety-seven," etc., which is easier to say and was already common in non-standard regional dialects, gradually replaced the traditional Germanic style to become the dominant style by the end of nineteenth century.

Opposition 

Linguistic purism in the English language is the belief that words of native origin should be used instead of foreign-derived ones (which are mainly Romance, Latin and Greek). "Native" can mean "Anglo-Saxon" or it can be widened to include all Germanic words. In its mild form, it merely means using existing native words instead of foreign-derived ones (such as using "begin" instead of "commence"). In its more extreme form, it involves reviving native words that are no longer widely used (such as "ettle" for "intend") and/or coining new words from Germanic roots (such as word stock for vocabulary). This dates at least to the inkhorn term debate of the 16th and 17th century, where some authors rejected the foreign influence, and has continued to this day, being most prominent in Plain English advocacy to avoid Latinate terms if a simple native alternative exists.

See also
 Influence of French on English 
 Linguistic purism in English
 Cultural globalization
 Internet culture
 Neologism
 Philosophy of language

References

External links 
 Mathematical Words: Origins and Sources (John Aldrich, University of Southampton) The contribution of French, Latin, Greek and German are surveyed.

English language
Cultural exchange
Global culture